ŽNK Dinamo Zagreb is a Croatian women's association football club (women's section of GNK Dinamo Zagreb) based in Zagreb. The club was founded in 2016 as successor of ŽNK Dinamo-Maksimir and it currently competes in the Croatian Women's First Football League.

Recent seasons

Notable players

The following ŽNK Dinamo Zagreb player(s) have been capped at full international level. Years in brackets indicate their spells at the club.
  Soumya Guguloth (2022–)

References

External links
ŽNK Dinamo Zagreb at Soccerway

Women's football clubs in Croatia
Association football clubs established in 2016
Football clubs in Zagreb
2016 establishments in Croatia